Rik de Voest and Chris Guccione were the defending champions but de Voest decided not to participate.
Guccione played alongside Samuel Groth, but lost to eventual champions Austin Krajicek and Rhyne Williams, who defeated Bradley Klahn and Rajeev Ram 6–4, 6–1 in the final.

Seeds

Draw

Draw

References
 Main Draw

Tiburon Challenger - Doubles
2013 Doubles